The Palamutluk–Balya–Mancılık railway (Turkish: Palamutluk–Balya–Mancılık dekovil hattı) was a , horse-drawn, narrow-gauge railway in Balıkesir Province, western Turkey. The line used the Decauville system of portable track units and was built to link coal and lead mines to the coast for export. When completed the line ran from the lignite mine near Mancılık to the galena mines at Balya and then turned southwest to run through the village of Osmanlar to a terminus at Palamutluk. From Palamutluk, ore could be carried via road on horse carts to wharfs on the Gulf of Edremit. In 1923, the Palamutluk–Balya railway was linked to the Ilıca–Palamutluk railway, which replaced horse carts in transporting the ore to the coast.

Mining history
Sites in the Balıkesir area have been mined for lead, silver and other metals since prehistoric times. The Romans mined lead at Balya Maden, known to them as Pericharaxis, on Mount Ida (modern Kaz Dağı). It is thought that much of the silver in Troy II came from this mine. There is also evidence for mining during the Byzantine and Ottoman periods.

With the advent of the industrialization in the late 19th century, production at Balya was expanded, initially by the Athens-based Société de Laurium. In 1892, the Balya mines were taken over by the French-funded Société Anonyme Ottomane des Mines de Balia–Karaïdin (known in Turkish as Balya Kara Aydın Şirketi).

Railway construction
Lead ore from the expanded Balya operation was initially transported to the coast by mule and camel. Later the mining company built a narrow-gauge railway to help transport the partly smelted lead ore to the coast. The first rail lines may have been laid as early as 1884.

This railway used the Decauville company's system of portable  narrow-gauge tracks. The report also described plans for a rail line to transport the lead ore to the coast for export.

The new terminus lay on the plain east of Edremit, from where there was a good flat road covering the remaining  to the coast at Akçay. Work to lay out the route started in January 1907, but had to be postponed until spring due to a particularly harsh winter. The company projected that the extended line would open in the autumn of 1907, but in the event it was actually not completed until December 1907.

Once the extension was completed, the full narrow-gauge line ran  from the Mancılık coal mines via Balya and Osmanlar as far as Palamutluk.

Accidents
Injuries and fatalities associated with the mine railway were recorded regularly in government statistics.

Production
The lead deposits at Balya and the lignite from Mancılık produced a steady income for the operating company. Production increased over the subsequent years with and average of 12,900 tons of argentiferous lead produced annually at Balya during 1910–13. The mine also produced 5,800 tons of blende, with a 41% zinc composition. The company's lignite production averaged 29,000 tons from 1908 to 1912. During these years, the company returned a 23% annual dividend to its investors.

Closure
The Palamutluk–Balya tramway appears to have closed by 1945. During a debate in the Turkish Parliament on 28 December 1945 discussing the fate of the Ilıca–Palamutluk line, Balıkesir Representative Hayrettin Karan and Transport Minister Ali Fuat Cebesoy noted that formerly a tramway line had run from Ilıca to Balya and stated that only the Ilıca–Edremit–Palamutluk line remained in place.

See also
Narrow gauge railways in Turkey

References

Sources

 
 
 
 
 
 
 
 
 
 
 
 
 

Railway lines in Turkey
600 mm gauge railways in Turkey
Ottoman railways